Serhiy Petrovych Labaziuk (born 4 June 1980) is a Ukrainian politician currently serving as a People's Deputy of Ukraine since 12 December 2012 from Ukraine's 188th electoral district.

Early life and career 
Serhiy Petrovych Labaziuk was born in Volochysk in the Soviet Union on 4 June 1980. He graduated from the Ternopil Institute of National Economy (now the West Ukrainian National University), specialising in economic and human resource management, in 2004. In 1999, he began his career in farming, and in 2004 rented his first farm, also founding Agrarian Company 2004 LLC the same year.

Political career 
In 2006, Labaziuk became a member of the Volochysk City Council. The next year, he was an unsuccessful candidate for People's Deputy of Ukraine in the 2007 Ukrainian parliamentary election from the Lytvyn Bloc as the 189th party list member. In 2010, he became a member of the Khmelnytskyi Oblast Council from the People's Party.

In the 2012 Ukrainian parliamentary election, Labaziuk was a successful candidate for People's Deputy in Ukraine's 188th electoral district, winning with 28.39% of the vote. He ran as an independent. Labaziuk was subsequently re-elected in the 2014 and 2019 Ukrainian parliamentary elections with 35.81% and 49.78% of the vote, respectively.

In the 8th Ukrainian Verkhovna Rada, Labaziuk was a member of the People's Will group of People's Deputies. He joined For the Future in 2020. He is a member of the Verkhovna Rada Committee on Agricultural and Land Policies.

References 

1980 births
Living people
People from Khmelnytskyi Oblast
Seventh convocation members of the Verkhovna Rada
Eighth convocation members of the Verkhovna Rada
Ninth convocation members of the Verkhovna Rada